Michael Artin (born 28 June 1934) is a German-American mathematician and a professor emeritus in the Massachusetts Institute of Technology Mathematics Department, known for his  contributions to algebraic geometry.

Life and career
Michael Artin or Artinian of Armenian origin was born in Hamburg, Germany, and brought up in Indiana. His parents were Natalia Naumovna Jasny (Natascha) and Emil Artin, preeminent algebraist of the 20th century of Armenian descent. Artin's parents left Germany in 1937, because his mother's father was Jewish.

Artin did his undergraduate studies at Princeton University, receiving an A.B. in 1955; he then moved to Harvard University, where he received a Ph.D. in 1960 under the supervision of Oscar Zariski, defending a thesis about Enriques surfaces.

In the early 1960s, Artin spent time at the IHÉS in France, contributing to the SGA4 volumes of the Séminaire de géométrie algébrique, on topos theory and étale cohomology, jointly with Alexander Grothendieck. 
He also collaborated with Barry Mazur to define étale homotopy theory which has become an important tool in algebraic geometry, and applied ideas from algebraic geometry (such as the Nash approximation) to the study of diffeomorphisms of compact manifolds. His work on the problem of characterising the representable functors in the category of schemes has led to the Artin approximation theorem in local algebra as well as the "Existence theorem". This work also gave rise to the ideas of an algebraic space and algebraic stack, and has proved very influential in moduli theory. He also has made important contributions to the deformation theory of algebraic varieties, serving as the basis for all future work in this area of algebraic geometry. With Peter Swinnerton-Dyer, he provided a resolution of the Shafarevich-Tate conjecture for elliptic K3 surfaces and the pencil of elliptic curves over finite fields. He contributed to the theory of surface singularities which are both fundamental and seminal. The rational singularity and fundamental cycles, which are used in matroid theory, are such examples of his sheer originality and thinking. He began to turn his interest from algebraic geometry to noncommutative algebra (noncommutative ring theory), especially geometric aspects, after a talk by Shimshon Amitsur and an encounter in University of Chicago with Claudio Procesi and Lance W. Small, "which prompted [his] first foray into ring theory".
Today, he is a recognized world authority in noncommutative algebraic geometry and his impact can be felt across many related areas.

In 2002, Artin won the American Mathematical Society's annual Steele Prize for Lifetime Achievement. In 2005, he was awarded the Harvard Centennial Medal. In 2013, he won the Wolf Prize in Mathematics, and in 2015 was awarded the National Medal of Science from the President Barack Obama. He is also a member of the National Academy of Sciences and a Fellow of the American Academy of Arts and Sciences (1969), the American Association for the Advancement of Science, the Society for Industrial and Applied Mathematics, and the American Mathematical Society.
He is a Foreign Member of the Royal Netherlands Academy of Arts and Sciences and Honorary Fellow of the Moscow Mathematical Society, and was awarded honorary doctorates from the universities of Hamburg and Antwerp, Belgium. He was invited to give a talk on the topic "The Étale Topology of Schemes" at the International Congress of Mathematicians in 1966 in Moscow, USSR.

Books

As author
with Barry Mazur: 

in collaboration with Alexandru Lascu & Jean-François Boutot: 
with notes by C.S. Sephardi & Allen Tannenbaum:

As editor
with David Mumford: 
with John Tate: 
with Hanspeter Kraft & Reinhold Remmert:

See also

 Artin–Mazur zeta function
 Artin stacks
 Artin–Verdier duality

References

External links 

 
 Michael Artin at MIT Mathematics
 http://nationalmedals.org/laureates/michael-artin

1934 births
Living people
20th-century American mathematicians
21st-century American mathematicians
Algebraic geometers
Algebraists
Fellows of the American Academy of Arts and Sciences
Fellows of the American Association for the Advancement of Science
Fellows of the American Mathematical Society
Fellows of the Society for Industrial and Applied Mathematics
German people of Armenian descent
Jewish emigrants from Nazi Germany to the United States
German people of Austrian descent
Harvard University alumni
Massachusetts Institute of Technology School of Science faculty
Members of the United States National Academy of Sciences
Presidents of the American Mathematical Society
Wolf Prize in Mathematics laureates